Koro ('village''' in Fijian) is a volcanic island of Fiji that forms part of the Lomaiviti Archipelago.  The Koro Sea is named after this volcanic island, which has a chain of basaltic cinder cones extending from north to south along its crest.  With a land area of 103.2 square kilometers (42.1 square Miles), it is the seventh largest island (approximately 5x10 miles) of Fiji.  Its latitude is 17.18°; its longitude is 179.24°.  Its population as of 2017 census was 2,937 spread across 14 villages on the island.  A roll-on, roll-off ferry services Koro weekly from Suva, and also connects Koro to Vanua Levu to the North. Fiji Link provides one scheduled flight per week to Koro, usually on Friday from Nausori Airport.  

The island has been accurately and exotically described by no one better than Captain Bligh of His Majesty’s ship “Providence”. During his historical journey from Tahiti to Batavia in 1789, he wrote, “the island of Koro is of good height, it is easternmost of the islands I discovered and passed and recorded in my log book on May 6, 1789, on the Bounty’s Launch. Nothing can exceed its beauty". 

The island has an airport, situated on its eastern coast.  On its northwestern tip is situated the Dere Bay Resort and the Koro Beach Resort. A residential subdivision, Koro Seaview Estates was established around Dere Bay Resort in 1989 and about 60 homes have been established in the development , including a re-constructed 300-year-old home imported from Java, Indonesia. Planting kava and selling copra are the major economic activities for villagers on Koro. Among Fijians, Koro is known as the most fertile island in Fiji, boasting large plantations and thriving tropical forests. Koro has an exception bird life and has been featured in numerous books.. The village of Nacamaki on the northern side of the island does a traditional turtle calling ceremony during which villagers chant songs and turtles rise to the surface. The island has several small medical stations and schools up to High school. A Police Post, Western Union and a Post Office are also on the island.

The US 2d Marines (regiment) of the 2d Marine Division and part of the 1st Marine Division undertook landing rehearsals (Operation DOVETAIL) on Koro in July 1942 before deploying to Guadalcanal. The short-lived 2002 U.S. reality show Under One Roof was filmed on Koro Island. Koro Island was featured on Home and Garden TV's International House Hunters'' in 2009. The episode was filmed in May 2009.

Transport
Ferry service by Patterson Brothers Shipping Company LTD connects Koro to Viti Levu.

See also
List of volcanoes in Fiji

References

External links 
 
 - Information about Koro Island and Owners community of Koro Seaview Estates
 - Information on Real Estate on Koro Island

Lomaiviti Province
Koro
Volcanoes of Fiji